Old Plat Historic District is a national historic district located at Huntington, Huntington County, Indiana.   The district includes 177 contributing buildings and 2 contributing structures in a mixed residential section of Huntington. It developed between about 1860 and 1920 and includes notable examples of Greek Revival, Gothic Revival, Italianate, and Queen Anne style architecture. Notable buildings include the Mathew Luber House (c. 1895), George W. Humbert House (c. 1880), Trinity Methodist Episcopal Church (1914), First Church of Christ Scientist (1919, now The Quayle Vice Presidential Learning Center), and Masonic Temple (1926).

It was listed on the National Register of Historic Places in 2000.

References

Historic districts on the National Register of Historic Places in Indiana
Houses on the National Register of Historic Places in Indiana
Greek Revival architecture in Indiana
Gothic Revival architecture in Indiana
Italianate architecture in Indiana
Queen Anne architecture in Indiana
Historic districts in Huntington County, Indiana
National Register of Historic Places in Huntington County, Indiana